John Thomas Perkins (20 January 1903 – 12 May 1955) was an Australian rules footballer who played with St Kilda in the Victorian Football League (VFL).

Family
The son of David Perkins (1871-1939), and Julia Perkins (1876-1957), née Looney, John Thomas Perkins was born at Chiltern Valley, Victoria on 20 January 1903.

He married Ivy Best (1903-1977) in 1929.

Football

Port Melbourne (VFA)
He played several games for Port Melbourne, before transferring to Northcote.

Northcote (VFA)
Perkins, a centre half-back,<ref>One of Northcote's Policemen: Perkins an Outstanding Defender, The Sporting Globe, (Saturday, 5 July 1930), p.4.]</ref> spent most of his career at Northcote, in the Victorian Football Association (VFA).

VFA Tribunal
He was de-registered by the VFA in 1933 following incidents in the first round of the VFA season. He had already been given lengthy suspension on three previous occasions for on-field violence: "for four weeks in 1925, for 11 weeks in 1929, and for almost the entire season in 1931".

Despite not having been re-registered by the VFA, he made two appearances in 1934 for the Northcote seconds. Following a complaint over his eligibility to play in the seconds, Perkins' case was brought to the Association Permit and Umpire Committee. He was eventually re-registered -- and, therefore, allowed to play in the seconds -- but, instead, he applied for a transfer to St Kilda.

St Kilda (VFL)
Already 31 years of age, Perkins made his debut for St Kilda, as a ruckman, in the ninth round of the 1934 VFL season.There's no doubt that his "rugged" approach to football was greatly admired by St Kilda's coach, the volatile Dan Minogue.

He played in a combined Victorian Police Association side, against a combined Western District Football League side, at Hanlon Park on 6 October 1934; and he represented Victoria against Bendigo in 1935.

He was St Kilda's club captain in 1936; however, as a policeman, he was forced to retire after three VFL seasons, following a declaration by the new Police Commissioner, Alexander Duncan, that members of the Victorian police force could not play professional football.Barclay, Bert, "Perkins Retires from Football", The Herald, (Monday, 29 March 1937), p.16.

VFL Tribunal
He was suspended for 4 weeks for striking in September 1934; and was found not guilty of kicking in July 1936.

Death
He died at the Royal Melbourne Hospital, in Parkville, Victoria, on 12 May 1955.Deaths: Perkins, The Argus, (Friday, 13 May 1957), p.11.

Notes

References
 
 "There's Jack Perkins!", THe Herald, (Saturday, 2 May 1936), p.16.
 (Caricatures of "leading St Kilda players" by Frank Lee), The Argus, (Wednesday, 29 April 1936), p.18.
 [http://nla.gov.au/nla.news-article224403569 Northcote Association Team, 1929, The Weekly Times, (Saturday, 20 July 1929), p.46.

External links
 Jack T. Perkins at The VFA Project.
 
 

1903 births
1955 deaths
Australian rules footballers from Victoria (Australia)
Port Melbourne Football Club players
Northcote Football Club players
St Kilda Football Club players